Themaca comparata is a moth of the family Erebidae first described by Francis Walker in 1865. It is found in India and Sri Lanka. It is sometimes placed in the genus Artaxa.

References

Moths of Asia
Moths described in 1865